José Berrondo Silva (26 October 1890 – 21 August 1936) was a Spanish footballer who played as a defender for FC Barcelona and Espanyol. He was also a referee and a Basque pelota player.

Club career
José Berrondo was born in Bilbao, but it was in Valencian Community where he began to play football, joining his hometown club Hispania FC during the 1911–12 season, before signing for FC Barcelona in the following season. In his only season at Barcelona (1912–13), Berrondo won all the titles at stake: The Catalan championship, Copa del Rey and Pyrenees Cup. Barça needed three games to beat Real Sociedad in the Copa del Rey final, and he only featured in the second game as a substitute to the injured José Irízar, helping his side keep a clean-sheet in a goalless draw. He also played in the Pyrenees Cup final, this time as a starter, netting a own goal in a 7–2 victory over Cométe et Simot.

He then moved to Espanyol, finishing his career at the end of the 1913–14 season, and he immediately began refereeing matches, a task which he would spend a few years, although he played briefly for Sarrià SC during this period. Eventually, Berrondo reversed his decision to retire and returned to Valencia five years later, in 1919, to join Valencia CF, featuring alongside the likes of Eduardo Cubells and Arturo Montesinos. He also had a brief spell with Sporting de Sagunto (1924–25) with whom he retired permanently. He went on to become the honorary president of Sporting de Sagunto.

Death
During the Spanish civil war, he was shot dead at the gates of the Canet de Berenguer cemetery.

Honours

Club
Barcelona
Catalan Championships:
Winners (1) 1912–13

Pyrenees Cup:
Champions (1): 1913

Copa del Rey:
Champions (1): 1913

References

1890 births
1936 deaths
Spanish footballers
FC Barcelona players
Footballers from Barcelona
RCD Espanyol footballers
Association football defenders
Spanish casualties of the Spanish Civil War